The North River is a tidal river channel, approximately  long, in coastal Georgia, the United States.  It is a longer and narrower alternative channel to the tidal Darien River and ultimately is part of the Altamaha River system in the marshes between Darien, Georgia and the Atlantic Ocean.

See also
List of rivers of Georgia
Darien River (Georgia)
South River (Darien River)

References

Rivers of Georgia (U.S. state)
Rivers of McIntosh County, Georgia